Josip Skoblar (born 12 March 1941) is a Croatian former professional football player and manager. He was primarily a forward, and also capable of playing on both wings.

He played for Zadar, OFK Belgrade, Hannover 96, Marseille and NK Rijeka. While playing at Marseille, Skoblar won the French First Division twice (1970–71, 1971–72), 1971 Challenge des Champions and 1972 Coupe de France. He was also the league top goalscorer three seasons in a row (1970–71, 1971–72, 1972–73) and in 1971, he won the European Golden Shoe. In 2009, he was inaugurated into the Olympique de Marseille Hall of Fame and in 2010 he was put into "The Dream Team 110 years of Olympique de Marseille". Skoblar is also part of the all time XI of OFK Belgrade and NK Rijeka.

At the international level, Skoblar played for Yugoslavia appearing in 32 matches and scoring 11 goals. He was in the national team at the 1962 FIFA World Cup where they finished in fourth place losing to Czechoslovakia in the semi-final.

As a manager, he managed NK Orijent, HNK Rijeka, Hamburger SV, Čelik Zenica, Dinamo Zagreb, Real Valladolid, Famalicão, NK Zagreb, Nîmes, Zadarkomerc, Marseille, Lebanon national team and Hajduk Split, with whom he won two Yugoslav Cups (1987, 1991).

Playing career

Club

Skoblar was born in Privlaka near Zadar (at the time in Banovina of Croatia). He started his career with NK Zadar (1957–58). He got spotted there by OFK Beograd goalie Perica Radenković who was serving his mandatory army stint in Zadar. Radenković recommended Skoblar to club management and the 19-year-old was soon on his way to Belgrade. With OFK Beograd Skoblar won the Yugoslav Cup in 1962 and 1966. In Germany he played for Hannover 96 (1967–70). In 57 games in Bundesliga, he scored 30 goals.

He was willing to play in Marseille, but the chairman of Hannover didn't want to lose such a player. Marcel Leclerc, chairman of Marseille, went to Hannover on a quick journey and came back with the player, it was the beginning of a great adventure with Marseille. The player was applauded at the airport by many fans.

In France, Skoblar played for Marseille and was three time top goalscorer in Ligue 1 (1971–73). Skoblar won the European Golden Boot in 1971 for 44 goals in Ligue 1, he still remains as the best scorer in a season in Ligue 1. With Marseille, he won the French league title in 1971, and French league and cup title in 1972. OM fans refer to him as "l'Aigle Dalmate", "l'Aigle Dalmate"/"l'aigle des Dalmates" (The Dalmatian Eagle), or "Monsieur Goal" (Mister Goal).

He left l'OM after the arrival of two Brazilians Jairzinho and Paulo César.

Skoblar joined NK Rijeka in the summer of 1974. He played for the club until 1977 accumulating 37 appearances and scoring 11 goals in league and Cup.

International
For Yugoslavia Skoblar played between 1961 and 1967. In 32 games for Yugoslavia, he scored 11 goals. Skoblar participated in World Cup 1962. Skoblar scored one goal, and Yugoslavia finished in the fourth place.
He first played for the national team on 7 May 1961, in a friendly match against Hungary. He ended his international career on 7 October 1967 against West Germany, before the end of the Euro 68 qualification competition. The Yugoslavia national football team ended 2nd of the Euro 1968 without him.

Style of play
When he came to OFK Belgrade he was assigned left winger (outside left) position, because of his versatility, technique and speed. While being a winger he continued to score goals although as winger he couldn't completely fulfill his goalscoring potential. While at Marseille he was moved to centre forward while being able to play all forward positions. Skoblar was very well known scoring with headers. He was also a solid dribbler with tremendous speed.

Reputation 

Just Fontaine speaking about Josip:
"When I watched him front of the goal, each time, I was thinking, kick from the inside of the left foot, ... from the outside of the right foot ... a header, now! ... he had already done it ... scoring each time, exactly by the only possible way, and in just a split second. In the last 30 years, he has been the only striker that I've seen like that in France."

Career statistics

Club

International appearances

International goal

Managerial career
With his playing career over, he came back to Marseille, and became technical manager in 1977 under manager Ivan "Ðalma" Marković. Due to an internal conflict he left the club after one season to pursue a career as a manager. He began his career as a manager in third tier club NK Orijent in Rijeka. He took the club to the quarter final of the 1981 Yugoslav Cup beating NK Zagreb and OFK Beograd. In the quarter final Orijent lost to Budućnost Titograd of penalties.

Skoblar joined NK Rijeka in May 1983 replacing Marijan Brnčić. He concluded the last six matches of 1982–83 season and saved the club from relegation and finished at 15 place. In his second season at the club Skoblar nearly won the League short three point from first placed Red Star Belgrade, Rijeka finished in fourth place behind Željezničar and Partizan. This result was the club best league result since 1965–66, they also reached the quarter final of Yugoslav Cup and qualified for UEFA Cup.

On 24 October Rijeka beat Real Madrid 3:1 in the second round of the UEFA Cup. This match made Skoblar reputation with the supporters and club rise to a status of legend. In their away match against the Spanish side they lost 3:1 with Real Madrid advancing and eventually winning the Cup. Many of the players and Skoblar himself have stated that they were cheated from victory by the referee. The season ended with the club at a mid-table eight place, four points shy of a European qualification.

1985–86 season started out poorly with losses in the league and elimination in the second round of the Cup. During the second part of the season Skoblar managed to secure fifth place with the club and secured a place in the UEFA Cup. 
Rijeka was eliminated during the first round of the 1986–87 UEFA Cup by Standard Liège. Mid-season Rijeka was in tenth place in the league and had reached the semi final in the Cup. Skoblar left the club in December 1986.

He later became head coach for Hajduk Split with whom he won 2 Yugoslavia Cups. With Hamburger SV he lost DFB Supercup in 1987. In 1988 he managed Čelik Zenica and saved them from relegation.

He also had short stints in Spain with Real Valladolid and Portugal with F.C. Famalicão. He also coached Croatian clubs Dinamo Zagreb, NK Zagreb, Zadarkomerc and HNK Rijeka. At his second stint at Rijeka Skoblar's results were unfavorable so he was sacked after two months in 1995. Later during the year in October he was again set as manager of Rijeka but was again sacked due to results in February 1996. Years later Skoblar stated that he wasn't given enough freedom by the (then) president of the club Hrvoje Šarinić to work properly with the team.

He is employed at the Marseille since 2001 as scout, and he is now close to retirement. During the summer 2001, he was with Marc Levy the co-manager of the team for 3 days, few days before the nomination of Tomislav Ivić. He managed the Lebanon national football team. He joined them in March 2000 and got sacked later in the year (October) after failing to qualify to the second round of the 2000 AFC Asian Cup.

Managerial statistics

 *Dates of first and last games under Skoblar; not dates of official appointments

Personal life
Skoblar owns a family restaurant with his brother in Zadar.

Honours

Player
OFK Beograd
Yugoslav Cup: 1961–62, 1965–66
Marseille

Division 1: 1970–71, 1971–72
Coupe de France: 1971–72
Challenge des Champions: 1971

Individual

European Golden Shoe: 1970–71
French championship top goalscorer: 1970–71, 1971–72, 1972–73
French Division 1 Foreign Player of the Year: 1970, 1971
Coupe de France top scorer: 1972
Ligue 1 Record holder for most goals in single season (44)
The Dream Team 110 years of OM: 2010
"Romantičari" (The romantics): Golden era of OFK Beograd
Olympique de Marseille Hall of Fame
NK Rijeka all time XI
Most goals scored in a single French First Division season: 44
Marseille 3rd all time goalscorer

Manager
Hajduk Split
Yugoslav Cup: 1986–87, 1990–91

Orders
Chevalier of the Ordre national du Mérite: 2015

References

Nogometni leksikon (2004, in Croatian)

External links
 
Josip Skoblar at Reprezentacija.rs 

1941 births
Living people
Sportspeople from Zadar
Association football forwards
Yugoslav footballers
Yugoslavia international footballers
1962 FIFA World Cup players
OFK Beograd players
Hannover 96 players
Olympique de Marseille players
HNK Rijeka players
Yugoslav First League players
Bundesliga players
Ligue 1 players
Yugoslav expatriate footballers
Expatriate footballers in West Germany
Yugoslav expatriate sportspeople in West Germany
Expatriate footballers in France
Yugoslav expatriate sportspeople in France
Yugoslav football managers
HNK Orijent managers
HNK Rijeka managers
HNK Hajduk Split managers
Hamburger SV managers
NK Čelik Zenica managers
GNK Dinamo Zagreb managers
Real Valladolid managers
F.C. Famalicão managers
Croatian football managers
NK Zagreb managers
Nîmes Olympique managers
NK Zadar managers
Lebanon national football team managers
Olympique de Marseille managers
2000 AFC Asian Cup managers
Bundesliga managers
Yugoslav expatriate football managers
Expatriate football managers in West Germany
Expatriate football managers in Spain
Yugoslav expatriate sportspeople in Spain
Expatriate football managers in Portugal
Croatian expatriate football managers
Expatriate football managers in Lebanon
Croatian expatriate sportspeople in Lebanon
Knights of the Ordre national du Mérite
Croatian expatriate sportspeople in Portugal